It Happened in Hollywood is a 1937 American comedy film directed by Harry Lachman and starring Richard Dix, Fay Wray and Victor Kilian. The arrival of sound wrecks the career of a leading western actor while his leading lady rises to new heights.  Its original working title was Once a Hero.

Plot

Cast
 Richard Dix as Tim Bart
 Fay Wray as Gloria Gay
 Victor Kilian as Slim
 Charles Arnt as Jed Reed
 Granville Bates as Sam Bennett
 William B. Davidson as Al Howard
 Arthur Loft as Pete
 Edgar Dearing as Joe Stevens
 James Donlan as Shorty
 Bill Burrud as Billy - The Kid
 Franklin Pangborn as Mr. Forsythe
 Zeffie Tilbury as Miss Gordon
 Harold Goodwin as Buck
 Charles Brinley as Pappy
 Scotty Beckett as Boy (uncredited) 
 Byron Foulger as Chet (uncredited)
 Edward LeSaint as Doctor (uncredited) 
 Sam McDaniel as Porter (uncredited)
 Zita Moulton as Englishwoman

References

Bibliography
 E.J. Stephens & Marc Wanamaker. Early Poverty Row Studios. Arcadia Publishing, 2014.

External links
 

1937 films
Films about Hollywood, Los Angeles
Films about actors
American comedy films
1937 comedy films
Films directed by Harry Lachman
Columbia Pictures films
American black-and-white films
Films produced by William Perlberg
1930s English-language films
1930s American films